Fantastica Mania, sometimes spelled as Fantasticamania, is a series of annual professional wrestling shows co-promoted by Mexican professional wrestling promotion Consejo Mundial de Lucha Libre (CMLL) and Japanese New Japan Pro-Wrestling (NJPW). Fantastica Mania is a series of two to seven shows that have taken place in Japan, in January of each year since 2010. At the end of the 2020 tour, 56 Fantastica Mania shows will have taken place.

Event history
The Fantastica Mania event series was a result of the working relationship between Japanese-based New Japan Pro-Wrestling (NJPW) and Mexican Consejo Mundial de Lucha Libre (CMLL) who had been exchanging wrestlers for short or long periods of time for several years before 2011. In late 2010 NJPW and CMLL announced that they would co-promote two shows in January 2011 under the name Fantastica Mania. The shows would take place in Japan organized by NJPW with CMLL sending a number of their wrestlers to Japan to work the shows. In 2011 and 2012 some CMLL wrestlers toured with NJPW prior or after the shows, while some of the wrestlers flew in just for the show. In 2014, the Fantastica Mania tour was expanded to five days, with events for the first time scheduled to take place outside of Tokyo's Korakuen Hall, in Osaka and Kyoto. In 2015, Fantastica Mania was held over six shows in Osaka, Takamatsu, Kyoto and Tokyo. In 2016, Fantastica Mania was again held over six shows in Kōchi, Kyoto, Osaka and Tokyo. The following year, the tour expanded to seven shows, held in Osaka, Matsuyama, Kyoto, Nagoya and Tokyo. In 2018, the tour is set to include eight shows.

As of the conclusion of the 2017 Fantastica Mania tour 78 individual wrestlers have competed in 207 matches split over 31 shows in total. Gedo, Jyushin Thunder Liger and Okumura have worked at least one match on each of the seven tours. King Fale, Kenny Omega and Toru Yano have only worked on one show in total. The Fantastica Mania events have hosted 24 championship matches, with five title changes; Ryusuke Taguchi defeated Máscara Dorada to win the CMLL World Welterweight Championship, Apollo 55 (Prince Devitt and Ryusuke Taguchi) defeated Golden☆Lovers (Kota Ibushi and Kenny Omega) to win the IWGP Junior Heavyweight Tag Team Championship, La Sombra defeated Dragón Rojo Jr. to win the NWA World Historic Welterweight Championship, Máscara Dorada defeated Bushi to win the CMLL World Welterweight Championship and Kamaitachi defeated Dragon Lee to win the CMLL World Lightweight Championship. The CMLL World Heavyweight Championship, CMLL World Middleweight Championship, IWGP Tag Team Championship, CMLL World Trios Championship, CMLL World Welterweight Championship, NWA World Historic Welterweight Championship, IWGP Intercontinental Championship, Mexican National Light Heavyweight Championship, CMLL World Light Heavyweight Championship, Mexican National Welterweight Championship and Arena Coliseo Tag Team Championship were all successfully defended. Fantastica Mania has hosted one Lucha de Apuestas, or bet match; while the Luchas de Apuestas match is the most important match type in CMLL, NJPW hardly ever promotes matches of this type. The match saw Tiger Mask put his mask on the line against Tomohiro Ishii, who lost and had his hair shaved off after the match.

Dates, venues, and main events

See also
List of New Japan Pro-Wrestling pay-per-view events

References

 
Professional wrestling in Tokyo
Professional wrestling joint events